IgA pemphigus is a subtype of pemphigus with two distinct forms:
 Subcorneal pustular dermatosis (also known as Sneddon–Wilkinson disease and pustulosis subcornealis) is skin condition that is a rare, chronic, recurrent, pustular eruption characterized histopathologically by subcorneal pustules that contain abundant neutrophils. This is distinct from and not to be confused with subcorneal pustular dermatosis type of IgA pemphigus. Sneddon's syndrome, also known as Ehrmann-Sneddon syndrome, is also a different syndrome.
 Intraepidermal neutrophilic IgA dermatosis is characterized histologically by intraepidermal bullae with neutrophils, some eosinophils, and acantholysis.

History 
Early descriptions were made by Darrell Wilkinson, a British dermatologist.

See also 
 Pemphigus
 List of cutaneous conditions
 List of conditions caused by problems with junctional proteins
 List of immunofluorescence findings for autoimmune bullous conditions

References

External links 

Chronic blistering cutaneous conditions